Strymon bazochii, the lantana scrub-hairstreak or smaller lantana butterfly, is a butterfly in the family Lycaenidae. It is found from Paraguay north through Central America, the West Indies and Mexico to southern Texas. It was introduced to Hawaii in 1902 to control Lantana species, in which it has proven unsuccessful.

The wingspan is 22–25 mm. Adults are on wing from May to December. There are two to three generations per year.

The larvae feed on Lippia alba and Lippia graveolens in Texas. In Hawaii, they feed on Lantana species and basils. Adults feed on nectar from various flowers, including  Bidens alba, Lantana species and Stachytarpheta jamaicensis.

Characteristics 
Strymon bazochii generally have metallic, brown wings with speckled, blue hues. Their eyes are grey. There are slight differences between male and female. Male butterflies will display horizontal, white lines on their wings. Females do not exhibit this pattern.

Life cycle

Metamorphosis 
Like other butterflies, lantana scrub-hairstreaks undergo metamorphosis. Eggs are deposited in the plant species of Lantana Urticoides. Within an average of thirty-one days, a caterpillar will have grown and begun forming its chrysalis. Overtime, the protective layer will harden and exhibit a dark brown color, indicating the imminent emergence of the butterfly.

References

External links
Butterflies and Moths of North America: Strymon bazochii

Strymon (butterfly)
Butterflies of North America
Butterflies of Central America
Butterflies of the Caribbean
Lycaenidae of South America
Butterflies of Cuba
Lepidoptera of Brazil
Lepidoptera of Ecuador
Lepidoptera of Venezuela
Taxa named by Jean-Baptiste Godart
Butterflies described in 1824